The France national rugby union team represents France in men's international rugby union and it is administered by the French Rugby Federation. The team's home matches are mostly played at the Stade de France in the Paris suburb of Saint-Denis. 
Rugby was introduced to France in 1872 by the British, and on New Years Day 1906, the national side played its first test match – against New Zealand in Paris. France played sporadically against the Home Nations until they joined them to form the Five Nations Championship (now the Six Nations) in 1910. France also competed in the rugby competitions at early Summer Olympics, winning the gold medal in 1900 and two silver medals in the 1920s. The national team came of age during the 1950s and 1960s, winning their first Five Nations title outright in 1959. They won their first Grand Slam in 1968. Since then they have won the title outright 18 times, including ten grand slams, and shared it eight times.

France has competed in every Rugby World Cup since it began in 1987, and qualified for the knock-out stage each time. They have reached the final three times, losing to New Zealand in 1987 and 2011, and to Australia in 1999. France hosted the 2007 Rugby World Cup, where, as in 2003, they were beaten in the semi-finals by England, and will once again host the tournament in 2023.

History

Rugby was introduced to France in 1872 by English merchants and students. On 26 February 1890, a French rugby team recruited from the Janson Desailly Lyceum defeated an international team at the Bois de Boulogne.

Although France were represented at the 1900 Summer Olympics, their first official test match did not take place until New Year's Day 1906, against the New Zealand All Blacks in Paris. France then played intermittently against the Home Nations until they joined them to form the Five Nations tournament in 1910. In 1913 France faced South Africa's Springboks for the first time; losing 38–5. France also competed at the 1920 and 1924 Summer Olympics, and on both occasions lost to the United States in the gold medal match.

France were ejected from the Five Nations in 1932 after being accused of professionalism in the French leagues at a time when rugby union was strictly amateur. Forced to play against weaker opposition, France went on a winning streak; winning ten games in a row during the years from 1931 to 1936. France was invited to rejoin the Five Nations in 1939 but did not compete until 1947 as international rugby was suspended during World War II.

French rugby came of age during the 1950s and 1960s: they won their first Five Nations championship and completed a successful tour of South Africa. Their first championship was won in 1954 when they shared the title with England and Wales. France won their first outright Five Nations championship in 1959; they won with two wins, a draw (against England) and a defeat (against Ireland).

France first toured South Africa winning the test series in 1958. The Springboks also visited Paris in 1961, the test was not completed due to onfield fighting amongst the players. France also toured New Zealand and Australia in 1961 losing both tests against the All Blacks but defeating Australia's Wallabies. They won their first Five Nations Grand Slam in 1968 by beating all four other competing teams, and won numerous titles in the following years.

In 1977, France won their second Grand Slam, fielding an unchanged side throughout the tournament and conceding no tries. They also defeated the All Blacks in Toulouse that year, but lost the return match in Paris. On Bastille Day, 1979 they defeated the All Blacks in New Zealand for the first time, at Eden Park in Auckland.

In 1981 the French clinched their third Grand Slam; at Twickenham against England. They again completed a Grand Slam in 1987 on the eve of the first Rugby World Cup hosted by Australia and New Zealand. In that tournament they came from behind numerous times to defeat the Wallabies in their semi-final, and faced the All Blacks in final at Eden Park, Auckland; France lost 29–9. They shared the Five Nations with Wales the next year, and also won it in 1989.

France hosted some of the tests during the 1991 World Cup, but were knocked out by England at the Parc des Princes (Paris) in the quarter-finals. France won the Five Nations championship in 1993. In 1994 France won a test series 2–0 in New Zealand. They were knocked out of the 1995 World Cup semi-finals by eventual champions the Springboks, but did win their third place play-off match against England. In November 1995, France played the All Blacks in two tests, winning the first 22–15 at Toulouse and losing the second 37–12 at Paris. France won back-to-back Grand Slams in 1997 and 1998. At the 1999 World Cup they defeated tournament favourites the All Blacks in the semi-finals, but lost to the Wallabies in the final.

The Five Nations Championship was expanded in 2000 to include Italy. In the now Six Nations Championship France won a Grand Slam in 2002. At the 2003 World Cup in Australia they qualified for the semi-finals where they were defeated by eventual champions England. In 2004, they won a second Six Nations Grand Slam, which was followed by a Championship win in 2006 and a successful defence in 2007.

During the opener of the World Cup 2007, Argentina defeated France 17–12. However, after defeating Ireland 25–3, France qualified for the quarter-finals. After defeating the New Zealand All Blacks 20–18, they lost to England 14–9 in the semi-final. France then lost for a second time to Argentina 34–10 in the third-place match. In 2010, France won its ninth Grand Slam.

During the 2011 Rugby World Cup, France defeated Wales 9–8 in the semi-final at Eden Park in Auckland, New Zealand, on 15 October 2011 and in the following week they lost 8–7 to the All Blacks in the final to make it three final defeats.

During the 2015 Rugby World Cup, France lost 62–13 to New Zealand in the quarter-finals.

In the 2019 Rugby World Cup, France lost to Wales 20–19 in the quarter-finals.

Uniform and colours

Until 1912, the strip (uniform) of the French team was white with two rings (the symbol of USFSA, the body that ruled the sport in France by then). The Gallic rooster was probably chosen partly because it is considered as a proud and combative animal that can be sometimes aggressive, although it had been used previously as a symbol by French teams – a former association football player, Jean Rigal, wore a uniform with this emblem as early as May 1910. The badge was initially white and red, but was altered to a multicoloured, embroidered image after 1945, and has been golden since 1970.

The symbol used by the French rugby team was a great success, and was later adopted by the French delegation at the Olympic Games of 1920 where the rooster was perched on five Olympic rings. The rooster has since become a well-known symbol of French teams. French players are sometimes called les coqs and some French supporters have been known to release roosters on the playing field before games.

The French team traditionally played in blue shirts, white shorts, and red socks, the colors of the national flag, and as such were nicknamed . When this strip clashes with that of their opponents, such as in games against Scotland and Italy, French players wear white. New strips were developed for the 2007 World Cup, one of which is a darker blue. In June 2011 they relaunched another kit which they wear blue shirt, blue shorts and blue socks for their home kit and they wear white shirt, white shorts and white socks for their away kit.

In 2011 the French Rugby Federation (FFR) announced that Adidas would be their new partner for a period of six years, with them taking over production of the France national rugby shirt from 1 July 2012 to 30 June 2018.

Led by newly elected president Bernard Laporte, the federation intended on selling the jersey to a sponsor. The FFR announced on 24 January 2017 that they had started the commercialisation of the jersey. In February, it was decided that the jersey would first be used to support France's bid for the 2023 Rugby World Cup by showing #France2023 on the front of the kit. In March 2017, the Groupe Altrad showed its support for France's bid for the World Cup and the company's logo accompanied #France2023 on the jersey. The group became the first private company in history that appeared on the France national team kits. As of 2017 and France's successful bid to host the World Cup, Groupe Altrad signed a contract with the FFR, appearing solely on the jerseys.

In 2017 the FFR announced that Le Coq Sportif would once again be their partner for a period of six years, with them taking over production of the France national rugby shirt from 1 July 2018 to 30 June 2024.

Kit providers

Home grounds

Historically, France played internationals at venues such as the Parc des Princes and the Stade Olympique de Colombes, both in Paris. The Stade Olympique de Colombes was the main venue for the 1924 Summer Olympics, where rugby was a sport.

Ever since moving out of Parc des Princes at the end of 1997, France's main home venue has been the Stade de France in Saint-Denis, where their home Six Nations matches are played. It has a capacity of 80,000. Since 2005, France has also played home internationals at the following venues around the country: Stade Chaban-Delmas, Grand Stade Lille Métropole (now known as Stade Pierre-Mauroy), Stade Gerland, Stade Vélodrome, Stade de la Mosson, Stade de la Beaujoire, Stade Bonal, Stadium Municipal (Toulouse) and U Arena.

The stadium was projected to cost €600M and have a seating capacity of 82,000. It was originally scheduled for completion by 2017, but later delayed to 2021 or 2022. In December 2016, FFR officially abandoned the stadium project.

World Cup venues
During the 1991 World Cup, Pool D (which included France) matches were played throughout France including Béziers, Bayonne, Grenoble, Toulouse, Brive and Agen. Parc des Princes and Stadium Lille-Metropole also hosted a quarter-final each. Pool C fixtures at the 1999 World Cup were played throughout France in Béziers, Bordeaux and Toulouse. A second round match was held at Stade Félix Bollaert, and one quarter final was held at the Stade de France, both 2007 venues.

For the 2007 World Cup, France was the primary host, and there were ten venues used for matches throughout the country (Cardiff in Wales and Edinburgh in Scotland also hosted some games). The French cities that hosted matches were Bordeaux (Stade Chaban-Delmas), Lens (Stade Félix Bollaert), Lyon (Stade Gerland), Marseille (Stade Vélodrome), Montpellier (Stade de la Mosson), Nantes (Stade de la Beaujoire), Paris (Stade de France, Saint-Denis and Parc des Princes), Saint-Étienne (Stade Geoffroy-Guichard), and Toulouse (Stadium de Toulouse). The final was played at Stade de France. They will host it again in 2023.

Record

Six Nations
France competes annually in the Six Nations Championship, which is played against five other European nations: England, Ireland, Italy, Scotland and Wales. France first contested the tournament in 1910 when the Home Nations became the Five Nations. France were expelled from the tournament due to rumours of professionalism in the then-amateur sport in 1932, but rejoined in 1947. They first won the competition in 1954, sharing the championship with both England and Wales. France shared with Wales again the following season, and won it outright for the first time in 1959. France's longest wait for a championship spanned 37 tournaments (1910–1954). The Giuseppe Garibaldi Trophy is also contested between France and Italy during the Six Nations. Over the whole history of the Tournament, they are the third most-winning nation, eleven wins behind England. However, it should be taken into account that France have been present in 34 fewer tournaments than the Home Nations. France has won almost exactly the same proportion of Six Nations Tournaments in which it has competed as England, and is the most successful nation in the post-World War II era (1945–present).

Rugby World Cup

The French have competed at every World Cup since the inaugural tournament in 1987. Although they have yet to win a World Cup, they have participated in the play-off stage of every tournament, and have reached the final three times.

In 1987 France took on pre-tournament favourites Australia at Concord Oval for a place in the final. In one of the greatest World Cup matches, the Australians appeared to be in control, leading 9–0, 15–12 and 24–21 at various stages of the match, only for the French to keep coming back. With the scores locked at 24–24 and the prospect of extra time looming, the French scored one of the most memorable tries in rugby history. Starting an attack from inside their own half, the French passed the ball through 11 pairs of hands before fullback Serge Blanco beat Wallabies hooker Tom Lawton to score a try in the corner. France won 30–24, and would face co-hosts New Zealand in the final at Eden Park. The French had not fully recovered from their magnificent effort in the semi-final, and New Zealand won the anticlimactic decider 29–9.

In 1991 France met eternal arch-rivals England in the quarterfinal at Parc des Princes. Earlier in the year at Twickenham the two sides had played off for the Five Nations Grand Slam. The French scored three magnificent tries but were denied by the fearsome English forward pack. In a very tense and brutally physical match, the scores were tied at 10-all when the French were awarded a scrum five metres out from the tryline. French number eight Marc Cecillon looked set to score the try that would have won the game for the French. Suddenly he was hit and driven back in a tackle from opponent Mick Skinner, a tackle which changed the momentum of the match. England went on to win 19–10 and eventually reached the Final. At the end of the match, France coach Daniel Dubroca angrily assaulted New Zealand referee Dave Bishop in the players tunnel. He resigned soon afterwards.

In 1995 France finished third overall, defeating England 19–9 in the third-place play-off after their defeat to South Africa in the semi-finals. After coming from behind to defeat the All Blacks in their 1999 semi-final, France lost to Australia 35–12 in the final. In 2003 they finished fourth, losing the third/fourth place game to the All Blacks. At the World Cup 2007, after defeating New Zealand 20–18 in the quarter-final, France lost out to England in the semi-finals losing 14–9 after finishing the break 5–6 ahead. France lost to Argentina in the bronze final to finish the tournament fourth.

France's 2011 campaign was marked by turmoil within the camp; reports before the tournament indicated as many as 25 of the 30-member squad had turned against head coach Marc Lièvremont. In pool play, France had unimpressive wins over Japan and Canada, an expected loss to New Zealand, and a shock loss to Tonga. During this stage, Lièvremont heavily criticized the team in the media, further angering many of his players, with veteran back-rower Imanol Harinordoquy publicly critical of Lièvremont. Despite the losses, they qualified for the knockout stage. At this time, the players effectively rebelled against Lièvremont; after the tournament, Harinordoquy would tell the French rugby publication Midi Olympique, "We had to free ourselves from his supervision." The team responded by defeating England 19–12 in the quarter final and controversially beating Wales 9–8 in the semi-final after Welsh captain Sam Warburton was sent off. The French proved admirable opponents in the final, however, losing out to New Zealand 8–7 to finish second for the third time in a Rugby World Cup.

France are the third-highest World Cup points scorers of all time, with 1585 points. They are also the third-highest try scorers, and the second-highest penalty scorers. France's Thierry Lacroix was the top points scorer at the 1995 tournament with 112 points, and Jean-Baptiste Lafond was the joint top try scorer in 1991 with six tries (equal with David Campese). Vincent Clerc is top try scorer in 2011 with six tries as Jean-Baptiste Lafond 20 years earlier.

Overall

France were named World Rugby Team of the Year in 2002. When the World Rankings were introduced by World Rugby (then the International Rugby Board) in 2003, France were ranked fifth. During November 2003 France briefly occupied third place before falling to fourth by December that year. After falling to fifth during November 2004, France rose again to fourth by April 2005. During early 2006, France rose again, peaking at second in July that year. France were ranked number two in the world until falling to third in June 2007 after two successive defeats to the All Blacks. They then fell to fifth after losing to Argentina in the opening match of the 2007 World Cup.

For the first time, France became world number one in July 2022.

France have won 427 of their 787 test matches.

Below is a table of the representative rugby matches played by a France national XV at test level up until 17 July 2021.

Players

Current squad
On 12 March 2023, Galthié named a 43-man squad for the 2023 Six Nations Championship final game against Wales. Emmanuel Meafou joined the team as an additional player and training partner since not being eligible to play for France yet. Paul Willemse withdrew injured the next day.

Head coach:  Fabien Galthié

 Caps updated: 18 March 2023

Selection policy
In December 2016, when World Rugby was considering a change in the eligibility rules for international selection, FFR president Bernard Laporte announced that the body would require that all France national team members hold French passports. This requirement is in addition to then-current WR rules mandating three years' residency for international selection, a period which WR increased to five years effective from 31 December 2020. Players who represented France prior to Laporte's announcement remain eligible for selection even if they do not hold French passports. Thus, since 2016 France have had the lowest number of foreign-born players in their Six Nations's squads.

Notable players
Ten former France national team players have been inducted into the World Rugby Hall of Fame. Its direct predecessor is the IRB Hall of Fame, founded in 2006 by the sport's international governing body, World Rugby, when it was known as the International Rugby Board. In late 2014, the IRB Hall merged with the separate International Rugby Hall of Fame, with all International Hall inductees becoming members of the World Rugby Hall of Fame.

Marcel Communeau (1885–1971), a back-rower for Stade Français at club level, played in France's first official international match against New Zealand's Original All Blacks in 1906. He went on to earn 21 caps for France, serving as captain for the country's first Five Nations appearance in 1910 and leading France to its first-ever win in that competition in 1911 against Scotland. Communeau is also credited with suggesting that France adopt the rooster as its team emblem. He entered the World Rugby Hall in 2015.

Jean Prat (1923–2005) earned 51 caps playing for France from 1945 to 1955, and captained France to their first wins over Wales and the All Blacks. He was also France's captain in 1954 when they won their first ever Five Nations (shared with Wales and England). Prat was inducted to the International Hall of Fame in 2001 and the IRB Hall of Fame in 2011.

Lucien Mias (born 1930), nicknamed Docteur Pack, was credited with inventing the concept of the advantage line in forward play. When inducted into the IRB Hall of Fame in 2011, he was called "one of the most influential captains of his country". He was most noted for captaining France to a Test series win over South Africa in 1958, the first such feat in the 20th century for a touring team.

André Boniface (born 1934) also played in France's win over the All Blacks in 1954; it was only his second test for France. Boniface went on to play 48 tests for France before retiring in 1966. He was inducted to the International Hall in 2005 and the IRB Hall in 2011.

Guy Boniface (1937–1968) emerged on the international scene shortly after his older brother André, although the two did not play together in the same France side until 1961. According to the IRB, the Boniface brothers "redefined the concept of back play through their unique blend of skill and creativity." Guy won 35 caps for France before his death in an auto accident in 1968. He was inducted into the IRB Hall of Fame alongside his brother in 2011.

Jo Maso (born 1944) first played for France between 1966 and 1973; mainly at centre. He played in France's first ever Five Nations Grand Slam in 1968, and that year toured New Zealand and Australia. He represented France in 25 tests and also played for the Barbarians and the World XV that beat England in 1971. Maso entered the International Hall in 2003 and became a member of the World Rugby Hall with the merger of the two halls of fame. He is now the manager of the France national team.

Jean-Pierre Rives (born 1952), a 1997 inductee of the International Hall who entered the World Rugby Hall with the merger, played 59 tests for France between 1975 and 1984; including 34 as captain. He played in Five Nations Grand Slams in 1977 and 1981, and captained France to their first ever win over the All Blacks in New Zealand. Rives is now a sculptor, and designed the Giuseppe Garibaldi Trophy (Italian: Trofeo Garibaldi; French: Trophée Garibaldi), which is competed for every year by France and Italy in the 6 Nations championship.

Serge Blanco (born 1958) played in 93 tests for France between 1980 and 1991. Playing at fullback Blanco won Five Nations Grand Slams with France in 1981 and 1987, and scored the match-winning try in France's semi-final against Australia in the 1987 World Cup. He is past president both of his longtime club, Biarritz Olympique, and France's national professional league, Ligue Nationale de Rugby. Blanco was inducted to the International Hall in 1997 and the IRB Hall in 2011.

Centre Philippe Sella (born 1962), who was also in the 1987 team, played 111 times for France between 1982 and 1995, setting an appearances record that stood until Fabien Pelous, who himself would be indicted into the World Rugby Hall in 2017, broke it during the 2007 Rugby World Cup. In 1986, he achieved the rare feat of scoring a try in each of France's Five Nations matches. Sella entered the International Hall in 1999 and the IRB Hall in 2005.

Lock Fabien Pelous (born 1973) was inducted into the World Rugby Hall in 2017 at a ceremony at the Hall's physical location in Rugby. He appeared 118 times for France from 1995 to 2007, surpassing Sella as France's most-capped player. According to World Rugby, "Pelous' spirit and robustness in the heat of battle made him perfect captaincy material", and he would captain Les Bleus 42 times, with only Thierry Dusautoir serving as captain on more occasions. In his 18-season club career, 12 of which were with his hometown club Toulouse, he helped Toulouse to two European and three French titles.

Individual all-time records

The record for points scored for France is 422, held by Frédéric Michalak, who surpassed previous record holder Christophe Lamaison on 22 August 2015. Lamaison continues to hold the record for conversions with 59. The record for penalties scored is 89 by Thierry Lacroix, and the drop goal record of 15 is held by Jean-Patrick Lescarboura. The record for French appearances is held by Fabien Pelous with 118. The record for tries scored for France is with 38 held by Serge Blanco.

Training

Coaches
Historically the role of French rugby coach (or trainer) has varied considerably. Due to the status of rugby union as an amateur sport for most of its history, the job of deciding tactics and running team trainings has often been that of the captain or senior players. Therefore, a comprehensive list of national coaches is impossible.

Although coached by Jean Desclaux between 1973 and 1980, the French team's main influence during the late 1970 was captain Jacques Fouroux. Fouroux played scrum-half and captained France to their 1977 Five Nations Grand Slam, during which France played a very forward-oriented style of rugby. Although the style of Fouroux's Gang was successful, it was criticised because it contrasted with the traditional open attacking style of French rugby. Fouroux was given the nickname "the little Corporal" – the same as Napoleon Bonaparte. Fouroux was named as Desclaux's successor in 1981 at the age of just 33. He continued to promote a forward-oriented style of play, and France won six Five Nations titles – including two Grand Slams – while he was coach. After nearly ten years in the role he resigned in 1990 after a defeat to Romania.

Fouroux was succeeded by Daniel Dubroca, who coached the team to the 1991 Rugby World Cup. Dubroca's tenure as coach did not last long, however, as he resigned after violently confronting referee Dave Bishop following France's World Cup quarter-final against England. Dubroca was replaced by Pierre Berbizier, who coached the team until after the 1995 Rugby World Cup. Berbizier's replacement, Jean-Claude Skrela, coached France to Five Nations Grand Slams in 1997 and 1998 before they came last in the tournament in 1999. He officially resigned following France's loss to Australia in the 1999 Rugby World Cup final. Bernard Laporte was appointed as Skrela's successor in November. Laporte guided France through the 2003 and 2007 Rugby World Cups before stepping down to become Secretary of State for Sport. After Philippe Saint-André turned down the offer to replace Laporte, French Rugby Federation president Bernard Lapasset appointed Marc Lièvremont to guide France to the 2011 World Cup. Lièvremont's tenure as coach was marked by inconsistent and puzzling squad selection choices, and player discontent. There were some bright moments, notably wins against New Zealand in Dunedin and South Africa in Toulouse, and the 2010 Six Nations Grand Slam. But there was also a 59–16 loss to Australia in Paris, a 22–21 loss to Italy in the 2011 Six Nations, and a 19–14 loss to Tonga during the 2011 World Cup. In August 2011, before the World Cup, it was announced that Philippe Saint-André would replace Lièvremont and guide France to the 2015 World Cup. This came as no surprise to Lièvremont, as he had announced as early as May 2010 that he would not continue as the coach of France after the World Cup.

France did not impress under Saint-André, finishing no higher than fourth in the Six Nations during his tenure and even claiming the wooden spoon in 2013. Following the 2015 Six Nations, he announced his resignation effective after that year's World Cup and was replaced by Guy Novès. France was even less impressive under Novès, with Les Bleus winning fewer than one-third of their matches during his tenure, capped off by a run of seven winless matches. Novès was dismissed in December 2017, becoming the first France head coach ever to be fired before the end of his contract, and was replaced by former Italy head coach Jacques Brunel, who arrived from the same position with Bordeaux Bègles. Novès' assistants were dismissed as well.

Updated 26 February 2023

Media coverage
France's autumn internationals and Six Nations Championship are currently televised by the public national broadcaster France Télévisions (especially by the main channel France 2) which lasts until 2015. The summer tour matches are televised by the encrypted channel Canal plus and the World Cup matches by TF1.

French sport specialist newspapers are L'Équipe (specializing in sport) and Midi Olympique (specializing in rugby).

See also
 Dave Gallaher Trophy – trophy for tests between France and New Zealand
 France national rugby sevens team – national rugby sevens team
 Le Crunch – traditional name for tests between France and England
 Trophée des Bicentenaires – trophy for tests between France and Australia

References

Bibliography

External links

   
 France on IRB.com

 
Rugby union in France
European national rugby union teams